was a town located in Munakata District, Fukuoka Prefecture, Japan.

As of 2003, the town had an estimated population of 14,362 and a density of 616.92 persons per km². The total area was 23.28 km².

On January 24, 2005, Tsuyazaki, along with the town of Fukuma (also from Munakata District), was merged to create the city of Fukutsu.

External links
Tsuyazaki official website of Fukutsu in Japanese

Dissolved municipalities of Fukuoka Prefecture
Populated places disestablished in 2006
2006 disestablishments in Japan